Dahlia Duhaney (born 20 July 1970) is a Jamaican retired sprinter who competed for her native country at the 1992 Summer Olympics in Barcelona, Spain. She won the world title in the women's 4 × 100 m relay at the 1991 IAAF World Championships in Tokyo, Japan, alongside Juliet Cuthbert, Beverly McDonald and Merlene Ottey.

Duhaney ran track collegiately at Louisiana State University.

International competitions

References

External links
 

1970 births
Living people
Jamaican female sprinters
Athletes (track and field) at the 1991 Pan American Games
Athletes (track and field) at the 1992 Summer Olympics
Athletes (track and field) at the 1994 Commonwealth Games
Athletes (track and field) at the 1995 Pan American Games
Olympic athletes of Jamaica
World Athletics Championships medalists
LSU Lady Tigers track and field athletes
Pan American Games medalists in athletics (track and field)
Pan American Games gold medalists for Jamaica
Pan American Games silver medalists for Jamaica
Universiade medalists in athletics (track and field)
Universiade gold medalists for Jamaica
Universiade silver medalists for Jamaica
World Athletics Championships winners
Medalists at the 1993 Summer Universiade
Medalists at the 1991 Pan American Games
Medalists at the 1995 Pan American Games
Commonwealth Games competitors for Jamaica
Olympic female sprinters
20th-century Jamaican women